This Is Living EP is the first EP from Hillsong Young & Free. Capitol CMG and Sparrow Records alongside Hillsong Music Australia released the EP on 13 January 2015.

Critical reception

Signifying in a three and a half star review for 365 Days Of Inspiring Media, Jonathan Andre citing that the EP is "one deserving to be listened to" and that it is "A must for anyone who loves EDM and worship,". David Jeffries of AllMusic, affixing a three and a half star rating to the EP, says that the first three songs "aim for the club with drum machine beats and bright synthesizer lines fueling the music," describes the acoustic version of "This Is Living" as settling "into afternoon material" and calls "Sinking Deep" an "empowering ballad". David Hitchcock, allotting the EP a four and a half star rating at Band Hangout, says, "All in all, the songs chosen make for a great and interesting EP" and that "Y&F has definitely pushed the boundaries of what has been considered "worship" music. Most of their "payoff" moments musically are instrumental breaks. Their melodies and lyrics push the limits of "congregational"." Giving the EP a nine out of ten rating on Geeks Under Grace, David Austin Black describes the EP as being "bright and God-centered, rejoicing in the freedom that life in Christ gives us and pausing to voice quiet, impassioned cries of the heart." Indicating in a four star review at Louder Than The Music, Jono Davies lists "This Is Living" and "Energy" as the standout tracks and states: "This isn't just an EP for young people, this is a fresh musical movement for anybody to get involved with. Musical styles and sounds are not ageist. Yet this EP has a youthful, even playfulness to it, but deep down right in the middle of the big dance sound is a heart to live for God. A joyful living for God and for me that's what I got most out of this EP." Caitlin Lassiter of NewReleaseToday bestowed the EP a four and a half star rating, noting that "After only minutes of listening to the music they've poured their heart into, it's clear that they're passionate about Christ and making His name known through worship. This Is Living is a perfect representation of that passion, exuding praise and joy from every single lyric." Jeremy Armstrong of Worship Leader rated the EP four stars, stating that Hillsong Young & Free "describes themselves as “young people who are passionate about bringing the message of Jesus, and the spirit of freedom that comes only from knowing him.” Their music certainly matches that description! Youthful, high energy, and fun. Perfectly suited for youth and young-adult settings."

Track listing

Charts

References

2015 debut EPs
Sparrow Records albums